Heorhiy Klymentiyovych Tsitaishvili (born 18 November 2000) is a professional footballer who plays as a winger for Ekstraklasa side Lech Poznań, on loan from Dynamo Kyiv. Born in Israel to Georgian parents and raised in Ukraine, he represents the Georgia national team.

Early life
Tsitaishvili, who is Georgian of Ukrainian descents through his grandmother, was born in Rishon LeZion, Israel, where his father Klimenti Tsitaishvili played as footballer. He is a product of the Dynamo Kyiv youth sportive school. His first coaches were Yuriy Yeskin and Oleksiy Drotsenko.

Club career

Dynamo Kyiv
Tsitaishvili made his debut for Dynamo in the 2018 Ukrainian Cup Final on 9 May 2018, playing in a match against FC Shakhtar Donetsk. The following season he made his European debut, when he came on as a substitute in Dynamo's 0–1 away loss to FK Jablonec in the UEFA Europa League.

Loan spells in Ukraine
On 20 December 2020, the manager of Vorskla Poltava Yuriy Maksymov announced that Tsitaishvili would be joining his club on a temporary basis.

In July 2021, he moved on loan to Chornomorets Odesa.
On 25 July 2021, he made his league debut for Chernomorets in a 3–0 away loss against Desna Chernihiv at the Chernihiv Stadium.

Loan spells in Poland
On 7 March 2022, following the start of the Russian invasion of Ukraine, FIFA announced all the contracts of foreign players in Ukraine would be suspended until 30 June 2022 and they are allowed to sign with clubs outside Ukraine until 30 June 2022. On 6 April 2022, Tsitaishvili moved to Polish Ekstraklasa side Wisła Kraków on a loan until the end of the season. He appeared in seven league games, scoring one goal, before leaving the relegated team on 7 June 2022.

In late June, he left Dynamo's pre-season camp to return to Poland and join defending champions Lech Poznań on a one-year loan spell. On 9 July 2022, he made his competitive debut for Lech as a starter in a 0–2 Polish Super Cup loss against Raków Częstochowa.

International career
Tsitaishvili was part of the Ukraine national under-20 football team that won the 2019 FIFA U-20 World Cup. He played in five of his team's seven matches in the tournament, and scored a goal in the final against South Korea.

For the senior level, he switched his allegiance to Georgia. He made his debut for the Georgia national football team on 2 September 2021 in a World Cup qualifier against Kosovo. He started and played a full match in a 0–1 home loss.

Career statistics

Club

1 Includes Ukrainian Cup matches. 
2 Includes UEFA Champions League, UEFA Europa League and UEFA Europa Conference League matches.
3 Includes Ukrainian Super Cup and Polish Super Cup matches.

International

Honours

Club
Dynamo Kyiv
Ukrainian Cup: 2019–20
Ukrainian Super Cup: 2019, 2020

Dynamo Kyiv U19
 Under 19 Ukrainian Premier League: 2018–19, 2019–20, 2020–21

International
Ukraine U20
FIFA U-20 World Cup: 2019

Individual
 Golden talent of Ukraine: 2019

References

External links 

2000 births
Living people
Footballers from Rishon LeZion
Footballers from Georgia (country)
Georgia (country) international footballers
Ukrainian people of Georgian descent
Georgian people of Ukrainian descent
Ukrainian footballers
Ukraine youth international footballers
Ukraine under-21 international footballers
Expatriates in Israel
FC Dynamo Kyiv players
FC Vorskla Poltava players
FC Chornomorets Odesa players
Wisła Kraków players
Lech Poznań players
Lech Poznań II players
Ukrainian Premier League players
Ekstraklasa players
II liga players
Association football midfielders
Expatriate footballers in Poland